Onychogomphus costae is a species of dragonfly in the family Gomphidae. It is found in Algeria, Morocco, Portugal, Spain, and Tunisia. Its natural habitat is rivers. It is threatened by habitat loss.

References

Sources

Gomphidae
Taxonomy articles created by Polbot
Insects described in 1885